South Bushwick Reformed Church, also known as the "White Church", is a historic Dutch Reformed church in Bushwick, Brooklyn, New York.  The complex consists of the church and attached Sunday School building.  The church was organized in 1851 by members of the Bushwick Reformed Church that dates back to 1654. Himrod St. was named after South Bushwick's first pastor. The church is a two-story frame, clapboard-sided building finished in 1853.  Its design combines Greek Revival and Gibbsian classical styles. The Greek Revival entrance portico features two giant fluted Ionic order columns.  Above the entrance portico is the tower with a square base and octagonal lantern and spire.

The Rev. Samuel Merrill Woodbridge (1819–1905), a Reformed pastor, and later author and theology professor, served this congregation from 1841 to 1849 after receiving his degree from New Brunswick Theological Seminary.

It was listed on the National Register of Historic Places in 1982 as the South Bushwick Reformed Protestant Dutch Church Complex.

See also
List of New York City Landmarks
National Register of Historic Places listings in Kings County, New York

References

External links

Churches completed in 1853
Dutch-American culture in New York City
Dutch Reformed Church buildings
New York City Designated Landmarks in Brooklyn
Properties of religious function on the National Register of Historic Places in Brooklyn
Reformed Church in America churches
Churches in Brooklyn
Reformed churches in New York City